John "Jack" Grinold (1936 – April 21, 2017) was an American athletic director. He has served Northeastern University as its sports information director for the past 46 years. In 1984 he was made assistant athletic director with the additional duties of heading the sports marketing and ticket departments, and in 1988 he was promoted to associate director of athletics. He was also in charge of all radio and television packaging. In 1998, in the celebration of NU's first 100 years, he was chosen as one of the 100 individuals responsible for the institution's growth and success.

Grinold is also on the executive committee of the Northeastern University Varsity Club and in 1985 he became the first non-coach/athlete to be elected to the Northeastern University Athletics Hall of Fame. In his 46 years at Northeastern, he worked 464 consecutive football games, including one undefeated season, and has enjoyed seven NCAA basketball tournaments, plus trips to the College World Series, NCAA hockey Frozen Four, and many sojourns to the Henley Royal Regatta in England.

Grinold was the first recipient of the New England Sports Information Directors Award for Excellence in 1971, and in 1979 he received the ECAC Service Bureau Award for contributions to the conference. He has served on numerous COSIDA committees over the years and has chaired the Committee on Committees and the Ethics Committee. He is the permanent vice-chair of the Awards Committee and has served on the Board of Directors of COSIDA. Grinold has won over 30 COSIDA awards for publication excellence. In 1994, he was inducted into the COSIDA Hall of Fame, and in 1999 received their Community Service Award. In 2003 he was elected to the New England Basketball Hall of Fame.

Grinold has been the chairman of the New England Collegiate Writers Association for the past 38 years. He also is the former president of the Eastern Massachusetts chapter of the National Football Foundation and Hall of Fame and now serves as its executive director. He received their Contribution to Amateur Football Award in 1994 and in 1996 was given a Chapter Leadership Award by the National Foundation. In 2008, the Board of Directors voted that the chapter be named the Jack Grinold Chapter. He was also honored by Boston University as the first non-media person to be the recipient of the Scarlet Quill Award. He has served as a press steward for the Eastern Sprints and the IRA Regattas for 33 years and was press steward at the venue of rowing and canoeing at the 1984 Olympiad in Los Angeles. He also is the secretary of Boston's celebrated Beanpot hockey tournament.

Grinold is a member of the Class of 1957 at Bowdoin College and the Class of 1953 at Browne and Nichols Country Day School. He also spent time in the United States Merchant Marine.

He is a life member of the Boston Athenaeum and has been elected to the Colonial Society of Massachusetts, and the Massachusetts Historical Society, where he serves on the Art Committee. He served on the Community Advisory Board to the trustees of WGBH-TV, and is vice president of the Victorian Society of New England, where he also chairs the Preservation Awards Committee, and is a former director of the Gibson House Museum.

Grinold is a recognized sports historian and has appeared on numerous radio and television shows, including Costas Coast to Coast. He has appeared on SportsChannel, ESPN, NESN and WABU, discussing the early days of sports in Boston.

Aside from the sports world he has written a history of the Hampshire House (former Bayard Thayer mansion) and contributed to Preview, the bi-monthly publication of the Museum of Fine Arts, and the New England Quarterly. He contributed a chapter to Tradition and Innovation: Reflections on Northeastern University's First Century, and segments to A Century of Sport in Boston.

References

External links
 GoNU.com Hall of Fame Profile 

1936 births
2017 deaths
Bowdoin College alumni
Northeastern University people